Miloš Markovic (Милош Марковић, 27 January 1947 - 25 February 2010) was a Yugoslavian male water polo player. He was a member of the Yugoslavia  men's national water polo team. He competed with the team at the 1972 Summer Olympics and 1976 Summer Olympics.

See also
 Yugoslavia men's Olympic water polo team records and statistics
 List of men's Olympic water polo tournament goalkeepers

References

External links
 

1947 births
2010 deaths
Yugoslav male water polo players
Water polo goalkeepers
Water polo players at the 1972 Summer Olympics
Water polo players at the 1976 Summer Olympics
Olympic water polo players of Yugoslavia
Place of birth missing